In set theory and computability theory, Kleene's  is a canonical subset of the natural numbers when regarded as ordinal notations. It contains ordinal notations for every computable ordinal, that is, ordinals below Church–Kleene ordinal, . Since  is the first ordinal not representable in a computable system of ordinal notations the elements of  can be regarded as the canonical ordinal notations.

Kleene (1938) described a system of notation for all computable ordinals (those less than the Church–Kleene ordinal). It uses a subset of the natural numbers instead of finite strings of symbols. Unfortunately, there is in general no effective way to tell whether some natural number represents an ordinal, or whether two numbers represent the same ordinal. However, one can effectively find notations which represent the ordinal sum, product, and power (see ordinal arithmetic) of any two given notations in Kleene's ; and given any notation for an ordinal, there is a computably enumerable set of notations which contains one element for each smaller ordinal and is effectively ordered.

Definition 

The basic idea of Kleene's system of ordinal notations is to build up ordinals in an effective manner.

 .
 
Suppose  is the -th partial computable function.
 

There are alternate definitions, such as the set of indices of (partial) well-orderings of the natural numbers.

Basic properties of <O 

  only branches at limit ordinals; and at each notation of a limit ordinal,  is infinitely branching.
 Since every computable function has countably many indices, each infinite ordinal receives countably many notations; the finite ordinals have unique notations,  usually denoted .
Since there are only countably many computable functions, the ordinal  is evidently countable.
 The ordinals with a notation in Kleene's  are exactly the computable ordinals. (The fact that every computable ordinal has a notation follows from the closure of this system of ordinal notations under successor and effective limits.)
 For any notation , the set  of notations below  is computably enumerable.
  is the universal system of ordinal notations in the sense that any specific set of ordinal notations can be mapped into it in a straightforward way.
(Jockusch)

Properties of paths in <O 

 A path  is non-maximal if and only if  is computably enumerable (c.e.). It follows by remarks above that every element  of  determines a non-maximal path ; and every non-maximal path is so determined.
 There are  maximal paths through ; since they are maximal, they are non-c.e.
 In fact, there are  maximal paths within  of length . (Crossley, Schütte)
 For every non-zero ordinal , there are  maximal paths within  of length . (Aczel)
 Further, if  is a path whose length is not a multiple of  then  is not maximal. (Aczel)
 For each c.e. degree , there is a member  of  such that the path  has many-one degree . (Jockusch)
Given a progression of computably enumerable theories based on iterating Uniform Reflection, each such path is incomplete with respect to the set of true  sentences. (Feferman & Spector)
 There exist  paths through  each initial segment of which is not merely c.e., but computable. (Jockusch)
 Various other paths in  have been shown to exist, each with specific kinds of reducibility properties. (See references below)

See also 
 Computable ordinal
 Large countable ordinal
 Ordinal notation

References

Ordinal numbers